Lingwood and Burlingham is a civil parish in the English county of Norfolk, comprising the large village of Lingwood together with the smaller villages of Burlingham Green, North Burlingham and South Burlingham. The villages are all within  of each other, some  equidistant from the town of Great Yarmouth and the city of Norwich.

Burlingham House is a Georgian Grade II listed manor house, the former seat of the Jary family, and is now a care home. 
Burlingham Hall (now demolished) was the seat of the Burroughes family, bought with 3500 acres in 1919 by Norfolk County Council as part of its farming estate.

The civil parish was created in 1935, by the merger of the ancient parishes of Lingwood, Burlingham St Andrew, Burlingham St Edmond and Burlingham St Peter. For the purposes of local government, the parish falls within the district of Broadland.

Lingwood is served by Lingwood railway station on the Norwich-Great Yarmouth Wherry Line.

The name Lingwood originates from "Lingwoode", the first name given to the area, meaning "slope of a wood". The village was first noted in 1190.

The name Burlingham means 'Homestead/village of Baerla's/Byrla's people'. The exact form of the personal name is uncertain.

Notable residents 
 Tracey Witcher, Barrow Girl and Pearly Queen.
 Catherine Blaiklock, founder of the Brexit Party, and former UKIP Economic Spokesperson. Forced to resign after anti-Islamic postings revealed.

Notes

http://kepn.nottingham.ac.uk/map/place/Norfolk/Burlingham

External links

 for Lingwood.
 for Burlingham Green.
 for North Burlingham.
 for South Burlingham.
Information from Genuki Norfolk on Lingwood.
Information from Genuki Norfolk on North Burlingham.
Information from Genuki Norfolk on South Burlingham.

Civil parishes in Norfolk
Broadland